John Birchensha (c.1605–1681) (sometimes spelled Birkenshaw or Berkenshaw) was an English Baroque music theorist. He presented at the Royal Society and made an impression on its members in the 1660s and 1670s.

Birchensha invented a system that he claimed would enable non-musicians to learn to compose in a short time by means of "a few easy, certain, and perfect Rules". This was at a time when other music theorists were codifying the rules of counterpoint, and writing about other rule-based and combinatorial systems to aid in the composition of music, such as the Arca Musarithmica of Athanasius Kircher. Information about his life and work remains scanty.

Early life
The son of Ralph Birchensha, an English official in Ireland, and his wife Elizabeth, he lost both his parents while still quite young, and was in the household of George FitzGerald, 16th Earl of Kildare, up to the Irish Rebellion of 1641. In the 1650s, he was known as a viol teacher in London.

Pupils
Birchensha's pupils included Silas Taylor, Thomas Salmon, and most famously Samuel Pepys.  Pepys recorded impressions of his sessions with Birchensha  (and hints at an eventual disillusionment with his teacher) in 1662.

Works
Birchensha's great aim was to publish a treatise on music in its philosophical, mathematical and practical aspects (which would have included a definitive summary of his rules of composition), entitled Syntagma musicæ. It was due to be published by March 1675. A summary was read to the Royal Society in 1676, but it never appeared, and no final manuscript of it survives. A manuscript for Robert Boyle, a relative by marriage of the Earl of Kildare, remains as the major source for his ideas on music.

In recent years, some manuscripts have been discovered which provide a more complete picture of Birchensha's theories.  A book of his writings (with a biography and copious analysis) was published in 2010.

References

Year of birth uncertain
1681 deaths
Baroque musicians
British music educators
English music theorists